Paul David Bettencourt (born October 20, 1958) is an American politician and businessman based out of Houston, Texas, who serves as a Republican member of the Texas State Senate from District 7. On January 13, 2015, he succeeded state Senator Dan Patrick of Houston, who successfully ran for Lieutenant Governor of Texas.

Political career

Harris County Tax Assessor-Collector
From 1998 to early in 2008, Bettencourt was the Tax Assessor-Collector of his native Harris County, the third largest county in the United States.

Bettencourt won reelection in 2000, 2004, and 2008.

The Democratic Party and plaintiffs filed suit and requested a temporary restraining order against the Voter Registrar Bettencourt after the 2008 election, asking a Federal Judge to block the counting of 7000+ provisional ballots from the November 2008 election. However, the temporary restraining order was denied by the Judge. All 7000+ provisional ballots were reviewed by Election Officials, and either rejected or accepted and then electronically counted.

Texas State Senate

2014 election
Bettencourt ran for the Texas State Senate in 2014 again enlisted the help of top Republican
Strategist Allen Blakemore.

Tenure
Bettencourt has also warned of serious pension liability problems in Texas and has proposed long-term market-based reforms which he claims will not impact those nearing retirement and have already paid significantly into the pension systems.

2018 reelection

Tenure
He authored a bill that the Texas Senate passed in 2019 that would move bond, debt and tax elections to the November general elections and limit the length of propositions.

Radio host
Bettencourt is a conservative talk radio host on KSEV, owned by his predecessor Dan Patrick.

References

External links
Senator Paul Bettencourt: District 7 government site
Paul Bettencourt for Senate District 7 campaign site
Profile at Ballotpedia

|-

1958 births
21st-century American politicians
American broadcasters
American conservative talk radio hosts
Businesspeople from Houston
County officials in Texas
Journalists from Houston
Living people
Politicians from Houston
Texas A&M University alumni
Republican Party Texas state senators